The Chicago Demotic Dictionary (CDD) or The Demotic Dictionary of the Oriental Institute of the University of Chicago is a project at the University of Chicago Oriental Institute to create a comprehensive dictionary of the ancient Egyptian Demotic language.

References

Ancient Egyptian language
Translation dictionaries